St. Vincent de Paul Church or St. Vincent De Paul Roman Catholic Church may refer to:

In Canada
St. Vincent de Paul Roman Catholic Church (Toronto)

In France:
Saint-Vincent-de-Paul, Paris

In the United Kingdom:
Church of St Vincent de Paul, Liverpool
Roman Catholic church of St. Vincent de Paul, and associated school Newland, Kingston upon Hull

In the United States:
Alphabetical by state, then city
St. Vincent de Paul Catholic Church (Mobile, Alabama)
St. Vincent de Paul Church (Los Angeles), California
St. Vincent de Paul Church, San Francisco, California
St. Vincent de Paul Church (Chicago), Illinois
St. Vincent de Paul Catholic Church (Louisville, Kentucky)
St. Vincent De Paul Roman Catholic Church (New Orleans, Louisiana)
St. Vincent de Paul Church (Baltimore, Maryland)
St. Vincent de Paul Church (Pontiac, Michigan)
St. Vincent De Paul Catholic Church (Cape Girardeau, Missouri)
St. Vincent de Paul Catholic Church (Perryville, Missouri)
St. Vincent de Paul Catholic Church (Bayonne, New Jersey)
Cathedral of St Vincent de Paul (Malankara Catholic), Elmont, New York
St. Vincent de Paul Church (Manhattan), New York
St. Vincent de Paul Catholic Church (Newport News, Virginia)
St. Vincent de Paul Church (Milwaukee), Wisconsin

See also 
 St. Vincent's Church (disambiguation)